Tomasz Porębski (born 28 August 1980 in Bielsko-Biała, Poland) is a Polish rally driver. He competes in Polish Rally Championships in Citroën C2R2 Max and is a current Champion in classes A6 and R2B. He also won the Citroën Racing Trophy Poland in 2009. He is related to motor sports on every day basis, leading a company in his home town dedicated to building and preparing racing cars.

During his career he has driven several different cars, such as the Fiat 126p, Fiat Cinquecento, Peugeot 106, Peugeot 206, Ford Fiesta ST and Renault Clio R3.

Achievements

 Polish Rally Champion in Class A-6 2009
 Polish Rally Champion in the class R2B 2009
 Polish Champion of Citroën Racing Trophy Poland 2009
 Victory in the A-7 Class – Magurski Rally 2008
 Victory in the A-7 Class – Rally of Poland 2006
 Runner up in the A-6 Class 2005
 Runner up in the N1 Class 2003

References

External links
 Official site of Tomasz Porębski
 Official Facebook profile of Tomasz Porębski

Polish rally drivers
1980 births
Living people
Sportspeople from Bielsko-Biała